Galio may refer to:

Galio, Liberia, a town in Grand Gedeh County
Galio, a League of Legends character voiced in English by Josh Petersdorf
Galio Arbelo, Cuban cyclist, gold medalist in the men's team time trial in cycling at the 1971 Pan American Games

See also
Gallio (disambiguation)